Pseudepimolis haemasticta is a moth of the family Erebidae. It was described by Paul Dognin in 1906. It is found in Peru.

References

 Natural History Museum Lepidoptera generic names catalog

Phaegopterina
Moths described in 1906